is a former Japanese football player.

Playing career
Oishi was born in Shizuoka Prefecture on November 26, 1979. After graduating from Shizuoka Gakuen High School, he joined Japan Football League club Kawasaki Frontale in 1998. Although the club was promoted to J2 League from 1999 and J1 League from 2000, he could hardly play in the match. Although he played many matches as midfielder, the club was relegated to J2 in a year. In 2002, he moved to J2 club Ventforet Kofu on loan. He played many matches in 2002. However he could hardly play in the match in 2003. In 2004, he returned to Kawasaki Frontale. However he could not play at all in the match and retired end of 2004 season.

Club statistics

References

External links

1979 births
Living people
Association football people from Shizuoka Prefecture
Japanese footballers
J1 League players
J2 League players
Japan Football League (1992–1998) players
Kawasaki Frontale players
Ventforet Kofu players
Association football midfielders